Kingville is an unincorporated community in southern Lamar County, Alabama, United States, about  north-northwest of the town of Kennedy.

History
A post office operated in the community under the name Kingville from 1877 to 1905.

Transportation
The community is served by three Lamar County roads:
  – north-northwest to State Route 17 (SR 17), just south of Hightogy, and east toward Belk (in Fayette County)
  – southwest to SR 17
  – north to State Route 18 and Beaverton and south to Kennedy and State Route 96

References

Unincorporated communities in Lamar County, Alabama
Unincorporated communities in Alabama